API Sanity Checker is an automatic unit test generator for C/C++ shared libraries.

The main feature of this tool is the ability to completely automatically generate reasonable (in most, but unfortunately not all, cases) input arguments for every API function straight from the library header files. The tool can be used as a smoke test or fuzzer for a library API to catch serious problems like crashes or program hanging.

See also 
 List of unit testing frameworks
 Sanity testing in software development

References

Software testing tools